is a Japanese actor and voice actor affiliated with Gekidan Mingei.

Filmography

Film
 Zassô no yô na inochi (1960) - Gorô Kanzaki
 Jamamono wa kese (1960) - Teppei Tanaka
 Kurenai no umi (1961)
 B.G. monogatari: nijusai no nikki (1961)
 Ankokugai gekimetsu meirei (1961) - Hasegawa
 Ashita aru kagiri (1962)
 Nippon musekinin jidai (1962)
 Kyomo ware ozorami ari (1964)
 Hadaka no jûyaku (1964) - Yamauchi
 None but the Brave (1965) - Pvt. Ishi

Television animation
Kobo-chan (????) (Iwao Sansen)
Saishū Heiki Kanojo (2002) (Akemi's father) (ep. 10)
Taiyō no Mokushiroku (????) (Takuma Yanagi)
Yakitate!! Japan (2005) (Gaia) (ep. 29)
Golgo 13 (2008) (Coleman) (ep. 39)
Soul Eater (2008-2009) (Mosquito)

Animated films
The Saga of Tanya the Evil (2019)

Video games
Kingdom Hearts II (2005) (Yen Sid)
Kingdom Hearts Birth by Sleep (2010) (Yen Sid)
Kingdom Hearts Re:coded (2010) (Yen Sid)
Epic Mickey (2011) (Yen Sid)
Kingdom Hearts 3D: Dream Drop Distance (2012) (Yen Sid)
Epic Mickey 2: The Power of Two (2013) (Yen Sid)
Berserk and the Band of the Hawk (2016) (Godo)
Kingdom Hearts HD 2.8 Final Chapter Prologue (2017) (Yen Sid)
Kingdom Hearts III (2019) (Yen Sid)

Dubbing roles

Live-action
Donald Sutherland
The Pillars of the Earth (Earl Bartholomew)
The Hunger Games (President Coriolanus Snow)
The Best Offer (Billy Whistler)
The Hunger Games: Catching Fire (President Coriolanus Snow)
The Hunger Games: Mockingjay – Part 1 (President Coriolanus Snow)
The Hunger Games: Mockingjay – Part 2 (President Coriolanus Snow)
Michael Gambon
Plunkett & Macleane (Lord Gibson)
Charlotte Gray (Levade)
High Heels and Low Lifes (Kerrigan)
Layer Cake (Eddie Temple)
The Good Shepherd (Dr. Fredericks)
Brian Cox
X2 (William Stryker)
Match Point (Alec Hewett)
Rise of the Planet of the Apes (John Landon)
X-Men: Days of Future Past (William Stryker)
Morgan (Jim Bryce)
Alexander (Ptolemy I Soter (Anthony Hopkins))
Alice in Wonderland (Jabberwocky)
The American (Father Benedetto (Paolo Bonacelli))
Argo (Lester Siegel (Alan Arkin))
Armageddon (2004 NTV edition) (President of the United States (Stanley Anderson))
Before the Devil Knows You're Dead (Charles Hanson (Albert Finney))
Ben-Hur (2000 TV Tokyo edition) (Quintus Arrius (Jack Hawkins))
Bruce Almighty (Jack Baylor (Philip Baker Hall))
Chocolat (Comte de Reynaud (Alfred Molina))
Damages (Hollis Nye (Philip Bosco))
Damo (Jung Pil-joon (Jung Wook))
Dangerous Beauty (Domenico Venier (Fred Ward))
Eastern Promises (Semyon (Armin Mueller-Stahl))
Elizabeth I (William Cecil, 1st Baron Burghley (Ian McDiarmid))
End of Days (Father Kovak (Rod Steiger), Businessman (Steve Kramer))
ER (Doctor Donald Anspaugh (John Aylward))
From Russia with Love (2006 DVD edition) (Ernst Stavro Blofeld (Anthony Dawson)))
Frost/Nixon (Richard Nixon (Frank Langella))
Get Smart (The President (James Caan))
The Girl with the Dragon Tattoo (Henrik Vanger (Christopher Plummer))
The Golden Compass (Magisterial Emissary (Derek Jacobi))
The Great Escape (2000 TV Tokyo edition) (Sandy MacDonald (Gordon Jackson))
Hitchcock (Alfred Hitchcock (Anthony Hopkins))
I Spy (Arnold Gundars (Malcolm McDowell))
Insomnia (2006 TV Tokyo edition) (Chief Nyback (Paul Dooley))
The Legend of Bagger Vance (Narrator / Old Hardy Greaves (Jack Lemmon))
Lord of War (Simeon Weisz (Ian Holm))
Miss Peregrine's Home for Peculiar Children (Abraham "Abe" Portman (Terence Stamp))
Monk (Doctor Neven Bell (Héctor Elizondo))
No Good Deed (Mr. Thomas Quarre (Joss Ackland))
Ocean's Twelve (2007 NTV edition) (Gaspar LeMarc (Albert Finney))
Panic Room (2004 TV Asahi edition) (Stephen Altman (Patrick Bauchau))
Promised Land (Frank Yates (Hal Holbrook))
Proof (Robert Llewellyn (Anthony Hopkins))
Roswell (River Dog (Ned Romero))
Rush (Louis Stanley (David Calder))
Spider-Man (General Slocum (Stanley Anderson))
Star Wars: Episode III – Revenge of the Sith (Palpatine (Ian McDiarmid))
The Sound of Music (50th Anniversary edition) (Herr Zeller (Ben Wright))
The Sum of All Fears (2004 Fuji TV edition) (National Security Advisor Gene Revell (Bruce McGill))
Superman Returns (Perry White (Frank Langella))
Terminator 3: Rise of the Machines (2005 NTV edition) (Dr. Peter Silberman (Earl Boen))
Titanic (Fuji TV and NTV editions) (Spicer Lovejoy (David Warner))
Tokyo Trial (William Patrick (Paul Freeman))
Tusk (Howard Howe (Michael Parks))
Westworld (Robert Ford (Anthony Hopkins))
You Only Live Twice (2006 DVD edition) (Ernst Stavro Blofeld (Donald Pleasence))

Animation
Disney's House of Mouse (Magic Mirror)
Megamind (Warden)
Lego Star Wars: The Empire Strikes Out (Palpatine)
Lego Star Wars: The Padawan Menace (Darth Sidious)
Star Wars: The Clone Wars (Palpatine)
Star Wars Rebels (Palpatine\Darth Sidious)

References

External links
 Home page
 
 

1937 births
Japanese male film actors
Japanese male voice actors
Living people